Amelia Martin (born 25 July 1983) is a professional squash player from Australia.

Pittock was born in Mornington, Victoria. In 2006, Pittock finished runner-up in the mixed doubles event at the World Doubles Squash Championships, partnering Cameron Pilley.

Her greatest achievement was being part of the Australian team that won the 2004 Women's World Team Squash Championships in Amsterdam in the Netherlands. She is married to squash player Rodney Martin and they have a son.

World Team Championships

Finals: 1 (1 title, 0 runner-up)

References

External links 
 

Australian female squash players
1983 births
Living people
Squash players at the 2010 Commonwealth Games
Commonwealth Games competitors for Australia
21st-century Australian women
People from Mornington, Victoria
Sportswomen from Victoria (Australia)